Abdul Ghani Azhari (1922 – 19 January 2023), also known as Abdul Ghani Shah al-Shashi, was an Indian Muslim scholar and historian who served as the head-professor of the University of Kashmir's Arabic department. He was an alumnus of Darul Uloom Deoband, Mazahir Uloom and the Al-Azhar University. He authored Qadim Tarikh-e-Gujjar, a book detailing the history of Gujjars.

Early life and education
Abdul Ghani Azhari was born in 1922 in Poonch, Jammu and Kashmir. He received his education at Darul Uloom Deoband, Mazahir Uloom and the Al-Azhar University. He wrote his doctoral thesis on Al-Muslim entitled, Al Imam Al Muslim Wa Manhajuhu Fi Al Hadith Riwayatn wa Dirayatan. He studied with Hussain Ahmed Madani, Ibrahim Balyawi, Izaz Ali Amrohi, Muhammad Tayyib Qasmi, and Syed Fakhruddin Ahmad, and his teachers at Mazahir Uloom included Muhammad Zakariyya Kandhlawi. At the Azhar, he studied with scholars including Abdel-Halim Mahmoud.

Career 
Azhari was a Kashmiri Gujjar and celebrated his Gujjar identity. He established Dar al-‘Ulum Nizamiyya Madinatul Islam in Badshahibagh (nearby Saharanpur), to cater to the needs of the Gurjar children. He also established religious seminaries in Kashmir, including Maktabah Anwar al Uloom, in Kokernag, and Darul Uloom Kawthariya near Dachigam National Park. In 2003, he established Darul Uloom Shah Wali Allah in Donipawa, Brakpora, in Anantnag. At the invitation of Shaikh Abdullah, Azhari served as a professor of Arabic at Madinatul Uloom in Hazratbal, Srinagar prior to joining the University of Kashmir.

Azhari was seen as a senior religious scholar in Kashmir. He served as the head-professor in the Arabic department of the University of Kashmir. He showed particular interest in the Qadiri order of Sufism and published works on the Naqshbandiyyah. He died on 19 January 2023 in Saharanpur. Salahuddin Tak, the current head-professor of the Arabic department at the University, described Azhari as "an eminent teacher, a great academician and an epitome of knowledge with high proficiency in religious science".

Literary works
Azhari's works include:
 Gujjar Tareekh te Saqafat, compiled by Javaid Rahi
 Noor-i-Irfan
 Ma La Budda Minh, a book that he translated from Persian into Urdu
 Maktubat-i-Naqshbandiyyah
 Qadim Tarikh-i-Gujjar, a detailed book on the ancient history of Gujjars in India

References

Citations

General bibliography

Further reading
 

1922 births
2023 deaths
People from Poonch district, India
Scholars from Jammu and Kashmir
Indian Sunni Muslim scholars of Islam
Indian historians of Islam
Deobandis
Indian centenarians
Men centenarians
Darul Uloom Deoband alumni
Mazahir Uloom alumni
Al-Azhar University alumni
Academic staff of the University of Kashmir
20th-century Indian Muslims
21st-century Indian Muslims
20th-century Indian historians
21st-century Indian historians